Furosemide is a loop diuretic medication used to treat fluid build-up due to heart failure, liver scarring, or kidney disease. It may also be used for the treatment of high blood pressure. It can be taken by injection into a vein or by mouth. When taken by mouth, it typically begins working within an hour, while intravenously, it typically begins working within five minutes.

Common side effects include feeling lightheaded while standing, ringing in the ears, and sensitivity to light. Potentially serious side effects include electrolyte abnormalities, low blood pressure, and hearing loss. Blood tests are recommended regularly for those on treatment. Furosemide is a type of loop diuretic that works by decreasing the reabsorption of sodium by the kidneys. Common side effects of furosemide injection include hypokalemia (low potassium level), hypotension (low blood pressure), and dizziness.

Furosemide was patented in 1959 and approved for medical use in 1964. It is on the World Health Organization's List of Essential Medicines. In the United States, it is available as a generic medication. In 2020, it was the nineteenth most commonly prescribed medication in the United States, with more than 26million prescriptions. In 2020/21 it was the twentieth most prescribed medication in England. It is on the World Anti-Doping Agency's banned drug list due to concerns that it may mask other drugs. It has also been used in race horses for the treatment and prevention of exercise-induced pulmonary hemorrhage.

Medical uses

Furosemide is primarily used  for the treatment of edema, but also in some cases of hypertension (where there is also kidney or heart impairment). It is often viewed as a first-line agent in most people with edema caused by congestive heart failure because of its anti-vasoconstrictor and diuretic effects. Compared with furosemide, however, torasemide (aka "torsemide") has been demonstrated to show improvements to heart failure symptoms, possibly lowering the rates of rehospitalisation associated with heart failure, with no difference in risk of death.  Torsemide may also be safer than furosemide.

Furosemide is also used for liver cirrhosis, kidney impairment, nephrotic syndrome, in adjunct therapy for swelling of the brain or lungs where rapid diuresis is required (IV injection), and in the management of severe hypercalcemia in combination with adequate rehydration.

Kidney disease
In chronic kidney diseases with hypoalbuminemia, furosemide is used along with albumin to increase diuresis. It is also used along with albumin in nephrotic syndrome to reduce edema.

Other information
Furosemide is mainly excreted by tubular secretion in the kidney. In kidney impairment, clearance is reduced, increasing the risk of adverse effects.  Lower initial doses are recommended in older patients (to minimize side-effects) and high doses may be needed in kidney failure. It can also cause kidney damage; this is mainly by loss of excessive fluid (i.e., dehydration), and is usually reversible.

Furosemide acts within 1 hour of oral administration (after IV injection, the peak effect is within 30 minutes). Diuresis is usually complete within 6–8 hours of oral administration, but there is significant variation between individuals.

Adverse effects
Furosemide also can lead to gout caused by hyperuricemia. Hyperglycemia is also a common side effect.

The tendency, as for all loop diuretics, to cause low serum potassium concentration (hypokalemia) has given rise to combination products, either with potassium or with the potassium-sparing diuretic amiloride (Co-amilofruse). Other electrolyte abnormalities that can result from furosemide use include hyponatremia, hypochloremia, hypomagnesemia, and hypocalcemia.

In the treatment of heart failure, many studies have shown that the long-term use of furosemide can cause varying degrees of thiamine deficiency, so thiamine supplementation is also suggested.

Furosemide is a known ototoxic agent generally causing transient hearing loss but can be permanent. Reported cases of furosemide induced hearing loss appeared to be associated with rapid intravenous administration, high dosages, concomitant renal disease and coadministration with other ototoxic medication. However, a recently reported longitudinal study showed that participants treated with loop diuretics over 10 years were 40% more likely to develop hearing loss and 33% more likely of progressive hearing loss compared to participants who did not use loop diuretics. This suggests the long-term consequences of loop diuretics on hearing could be a more significant than previously thought and further research is required in this area.  

Other precautions include: nephrotoxicity, sulfonamide (sulfa) allergy, and increases free thyroid hormone effects with large doses.

Interactions
Furosemide has potential interactions with these medications:
 Aspirin and other salicylates
 Other diuretics (e.g. ethacrynic acid, hydrochlorothiazide)
 Synergistic effects with other antihypertensives (e.g. doxazosin)
 Sucralfate

Potentially hazardous interactions with other drugs:
 Analgesics: increased risk of kidney damage (nephrotoxicity) with nonsteroidal anti-inflammatory drugs; antagonism of diuretic effect with NSAIDs
 Antiarrhythmics: a risk of cardiac toxicity exists with antiarrhythmics if hypokalemia occurs; the effects of lidocaine and mexiletine are antagonized.
 Antibacterials: increased risk of ototoxicity with aminoglycosides, polymyxins and vancomycin; avoid concomitant use with lymecycline
 Antidepressants: increased risk of hypokalemia with reboxetine; enhanced hypotensive effect with MAOIs; increased risk of postural hypotension with tricyclic antidepressants
 Antiepileptics: increased risk of hyponatremia with carbamazepine
 Antifungals: increased risk of hypokalemia with amphotericin
 Antihypertensives: enhanced hypotensive effect; increased risk of first dose hypotensive effect with alpha-blockers; increased risk of ventricular arrhythmias with sotalol if hypokalemia occurs
 Antipsychotics: increased risk of ventricular arrhythmias with amisulpride, sertindole, or pimozide (avoid with pimozide) if hypokalemia occurs; enhanced hypotensive effect with phenothiazines
 Atomoxetine: hypokalemia increases risk of ventricular arrhythmias
 Cardiac glycosides: increased toxicity if hypokalemia occurs
 Cyclosporine: variable reports of increased nephrotoxicity, ototoxicity and hepatotoxicity
 Lithium: risk of toxicity.

Mechanism of action

Furosemide, like other loop diuretics, acts by inhibiting the luminal Na-K-Cl cotransporter in the thick ascending limb of the loop of Henle, by binding to the chloride transport channel, thus causing more sodium, chloride, and potassium to be excreted in the urine.

The action on the distal tubules is independent of any inhibitory effect on carbonic anhydrase or aldosterone; it also abolishes the corticomedullary osmotic gradient and blocks negative, as well as positive, free water clearance. Because of the large NaCl absorptive capacity of the loop of Henle, diuresis is not limited by development of acidosis, as it is with the carbonic anhydrase inhibitors.

Additionally, furosemide is a noncompetitive subtype-specific blocker of GABA-A receptors. Furosemide has been reported to reversibly antagonize GABA-evoked currents of α6β2γ2 receptors at μM concentrations, but not α1β2γ2 receptors. During development, the α6β2γ2 receptor increases in expression in cerebellar granule neurons, corresponding to increased sensitivity to furosemide.

Pharmacokinetics
 Molecular weight (daltons)             330.7
 % Bioavailability    47-70%
 Bioavailability with end-stage renal disease   43 - 46%
 % Protein binding                      91–99
 Volume of distribution (L/kg)          0.07 – 0.2
 Volume of distribution may be higher in patients with cirrhosis or nephrotic syndrome
 Excretion
 % Excreted in urine (% of total dose)   60 - 90
 % Excreted unchanged in urine (% of total dose)         53.1 - 58.8 
 % Excreted in feces (% of total dose) 7 - 9
 % Excreted in bile (% of total dose) 6 - 9
 Approximately 10% is metabolized by the liver in healthy individuals, but this percentage may be greater in individuals with severe kidney failure 
 Renal clearance (mL/min/kg)  2.0
 Elimination half-life (hrs)   2
 Prolonged in congestive heart failure (mean 3.4 hrs)
 Prolonged in severe kidney failure (4 - 6 hrs) and anephric patients (1.5-9 hrs)
 Time to peak concentration (hrs)
 Intravenous administration    0.3
 Oral solution    0.83
 Oral tablet     1.45

The pharmacokinetics of furosemide are apparently not significantly altered by food.

No direct relationship has been found between furosemide concentration in the plasma and furosemide efficacy. Efficacy depends upon the concentration of furosemide in urine.

Names
Furosemide is the INN and BAN. The previous BAN was frusemide.

Brand names under which furosemide is marketed include: Aisemide, Apo-Furosemide, Beronald, Desdemin, Discoid, Diural, Diurapid, Dryptal, Durafurid, Edemid, Errolon, Eutensin, Flusapex, Frudix, Frusemide, Frusetic, Frusid, Fulsix, Fuluvamide, Furesis, Furix, Furo-Puren, Furon, Furosedon, Fusid.frusone, Hydro-rapid, Impugan, Katlex, Lasilix, Lasix, Lodix, Lowpston, Macasirool, Mirfat, Nicorol, Odemase, Oedemex, Profemin, Rosemide, Rusyde, Salix, Seguril, Teva-Furosemide, Trofurit, Uremide, and Urex.

Veterinary uses
The diuretic effects are put to use most commonly in horses to prevent bleeding during a race. Sometime in the early 1970s, furosemide's ability to prevent, or at least greatly reduce, the incidence of bleeding (exercise-induced pulmonary hemorrhage) by horses during races was discovered accidentally.  In the United States of America, pursuant to the racing rules of most states, horses that bleed from the nostrils three times are permanently barred from racing. Clinical trials followed, and by decade's end, racing commissions in some states in the USA began legalizing its use on race horses.  In 1995, New York became the last state in the United States to approve such use, after years of refusing to consider doing so. Some states allow its use for all racehorses; some allow it only for confirmed "bleeders".  Its use for this purpose is still prohibited in many other countries.

Furosemide is also used in horses for pulmonary edema, congestive heart failure (in combination with other drugs), and allergic reactions.  Although it increases circulation to the kidneys, it does not help kidney function, and is not recommended for kidney disease.

It is also used to treat congestive heart failure (pulmonary edema, pleural effusion, and/or ascites) in cats and dogs. It can also be used in an attempt to promote urine production in anuric or oliguric acute kidney failure.

Horses
Furosemide is injected either intramuscularly or intravenously, usually 0.5-1.0 mg/kg twice/day, although less before a horse is raced. As with many diuretics, it can cause dehydration and electrolyte imbalance, including loss of potassium, calcium, sodium, and magnesium. Excessive use of furosemide will most likely lead to a metabolic alkalosis due to hypochloremia and hypokalemia. The drug should, therefore, not be used in horses that are dehydrated or experiencing kidney failure. It should be used with caution in horses with liver problems or electrolyte abnormalities. Overdose may lead to dehydration, change in drinking patterns and urination, seizures, gastrointestinal problems, kidney damage, lethargy, collapse, and coma.

Furosemide should be used with caution when combined with corticosteroids (as this increases the risk of electrolyte imbalance), aminoglycoside antibiotics (increases risk of kidney or ear damage), and trimethoprim sulfa (causes decreased platelet count). It may also cause interactions with anesthetics, so its use should be related to the veterinarian if the animal is going into surgery, and it decreases the kidneys' ability to excrete aspirin, so dosages will need to be adjusted if combined with that drug.

Furosemide may increase the risk of digoxin toxicity due to hypokalemia.

The drug is best not used during pregnancy or in a lactating mare, as it has been shown to be passed through the placenta and milk in studies with other species. It should not be used in horses with pituitary pars intermedia dysfunction (Cushings).

Furosemide is detectable in urine 36–72 hours following injection. Its use is restricted by most equestrian organizations.

In April 2019, it was announced that Lasix would be banned from use at US racetracks within 24 hours of a horse racing starting in 2021.

References

Further reading
 Aventis Pharma (1998). Lasix Approved Product Information. Lane Cove: Aventis Pharma Pty Ltd.

External links

 
 
 Lasix and horse bleeding

Anthranilic acids
Carbonic anhydrase inhibitors
Chemical substances for emergency medicine
Chloroarenes
Equine medications
2-Furyl compounds
GABAA receptor negative allosteric modulators
Glycine receptor antagonists
Loop diuretics
Nephrotoxins
NMDA receptor antagonists
Wikipedia medicine articles ready to translate
Sanofi
Sulfonamides
World Anti-Doping Agency prohibited substances
World Health Organization essential medicines